Vincent Cantoni (Laguiole, 10 March 1927 – Grenade, 28 October 2013) was a French rugby league footballer who represented France national rugby league team in the 1954 World Cup. He was the father of the French former rugby union international Jack Cantoni.

Cantoni toured Australia and New Zealand in 1951 with the French side.

He died in 2013.

References

1927 births
2013 deaths
France national rugby league team players
French rugby league coaches
French rugby league players
Rugby league wingers
Sportspeople from Aveyron
Toulouse Olympique coaches
Toulouse Olympique players